Galo Ochoa was born in 1967 in Los Angeles, California, is the guitarist for the bands Cuca and Nata.

Cuca 

His career began with this band and for which he is most known. Its characteristic sound is mainly hard rock. Cuca's most popular songs are "El Son del Dolor", "La Pucha Asesina", "La Balada".

Nata 

After the breakup of Cuca (1999), Galo, his  brother Aldo, Christian Gómez and Carlos Aviléz Gómez (also bassist for Cuca) formed Nata, whose sound is rather close to heavy metal.

Discography

With Cuca 
 La Invasión de los Blátidos, 1992
 Tu Cuca Madre Ataca de Nuevo, 1993
 La Racha, 1995
 El Cuarto de Cuca, 1997
 Viva Cuca, 2004
 }, 2006

With Nata 
 Nata, 2002
 Krudo, 2007
 CHOKE, 2013

References 

1967 births
Cuca (band) members
Musicians from Sonora
Mexican guitarists
Mexican male guitarists
Living people
Date of birth missing (living people)
Guitarists from Los Angeles
American male guitarists
20th-century American guitarists
20th-century American male musicians